Dilip Sopal is a Shiv Sena politician from Solapur district.  He was a member of Maharashtra Legislative Assembly representing Barshi Vidhan Sabha constituency from 2009 to 2019.

Positions held
 1985: Elected as Member of Maharashtra Legislative Assembly (1st term) 
 1990: Elected as Member of Maharashtra Legislative Assembly (2nd term) 
 1995: Elected as Member of Maharashtra Legislative Assembly (3rd term) 
 1995: Appointed as Minister of State for Law and Judiciary in Government of Maharashtra
 1999: Elected as Member of Maharashtra Legislative Assembly (4th term) 
 2009: Elected as Member of Maharashtra Legislative Assembly (5th term) 
 2013: Appointed as Cabinet Minister of Water supply and Sanitation in Government of Maharashtra
 2014: Elected as Member of Maharashtra Legislative Assembly (6th term)

References

External links
 The Shivsena

Maharashtra MLAs 2014–2019
Living people
People from Solapur district
Shiv Sena politicians
1949 births